This is a list of the busiest airports in Russia, using data from the Federal Air Transport Agency.

Overview

Russia's busiest airports by passenger traffic in 2019 (provisional)
Includes airports with total traffic over 100,000 passengers. Source: Russian Federal Air Transport Agency (see also provisional 2019 statistics)

Russia's busiest airports by passenger traffic in 2018 (provisional)
Includes airports with total traffic over 100,000 passengers. Source: Russian Federal Air Transport Agency (see also provisional 2018 statistics)

Russia's busiest airports by passenger traffic in 2017 
Includes airports with total traffic over 100,000 passengers. Source: Russian Federal Air Transport Agency (see also provisional 2018 statistics)

Russia's busiest airports by passenger traffic in 2016
The airports with total traffic more than 100,000 passengers. Source: Federal Air Transport Agency

Russia's busiest airports by passenger traffic in 2015
The airports with total traffic more than 100,000 passengers. Source: Federal Agency of air transport

Russia's 50 busiest airports by passenger traffic in 2014

Russia's 58 busiest airports by passenger traffic in 2013

Russia's 58 busiest airports by passenger traffic in 2012

Russia's 50 busiest airports by passenger traffic in 2011

Russia's 20 busiest airports by passenger traffic in 2010

See also
 List of the busiest airports in the former USSR
 List of the busiest airports in Europe

Notes

References

Russia